Greenleaf Friends Academy is a private Christian school in Greenleaf, Idaho serving preschool through 12th grades.

Located in the tranquil Boise Valley just 6 miles west of Caldwell, the academy has grown over the past century from a one-room schoolhouse into a facility consisting of classrooms, a gymnasium, elementary building, preschool building, cafeteria, athletic fields, and playgrounds.

It was founded in 1908 by a group of Friends (Quakers) as a college preparatory high school for the Quaker-founded community of Greenleaf, Idaho.

Junior High grades were added in the mid-1960s and Elementary grades added in the mid-1970s.

Local professionals,  representing various Friends churches, other supporting churches and the academy's alumni comprise the 11 member governing Board of Trustees.

Greenleaf Friends Academy holds affiliation with Associated Christian Schools International (ACSI), Northwest Yearly Meeting, part of Evangelical Friends International and holds state recognized school accreditation through AdvancEd.

Notable alumni
 Emmett W. Gulley (1894–1981), missionary, professor, and president of Pacific College (now named George Fox University)
 H. Corwin Hinshaw (1902–2000), physician, professor, and pioneer of the use streptomycin to cure tuberculosis
 Arthur O. Roberts (1922–2016), author, missionary, pastor, and professor of religion

References 

 http://gfaschools.org/home/about/

Private high schools in Idaho
Schools in Canyon County, Idaho
Private middle schools in Idaho
Private elementary schools in Idaho
1908 establishments in Idaho
Quaker schools in Idaho